Compass International School Doha is a private, co-educational school in Doha, Qatar. It is an International School with campuses located in Gharaffa, Madinat Khalifa, and Al Themaid. It was founded in 2006 by Fieldwork Education and the school is part of the Nord Anglia group of schools.

External links 

Schools in Qatar
Educational institutions established in 2006
International schools in Qatar
2006 establishments in Qatar
British international schools in Qatar
Nord Anglia Education